Paniala   is a small town located in the north of district D.I.Khan of Khyber-Pakhtunkhwa about 55 km away from D I Khan and approx 300 km from provincial capital Peshawar.
The Link Road (also known as Gilloti Road) from main Indus Highway (Peshawar Road) that connects with Paniala is of about 18 km.
It is a submontane settlement and one of the oldest in Khyber Pakhtunkhwa Province in Pakistan.

The name Paniala originated from "Panjh Naala", which means 5 Naalas, stemming from Oobo Sir (in Pashto), which means "head of water", and then combines into one form. The water is then supplied to whole of the village and nearby towns for feeding and cultivating the fields. And then from passage of time the name Panjh Naala changed into Paniala.

Another origin of the name Paniala is attributed to the meaning of combination of Urdu words, pani and wala. Pani wala thus meant "a place with water". This was the only oasis town in the surrounding desert area of about 30 km radius where even drinking water was not available to the population around, and the habitat around would fetch drinking water from the natural fountains/springs and KAREZs of Paniala. Thus the name Pani wala became Paniala with the passage of time. Water is, nonetheless, still supplied to numerous villages on the east, west and south from Paniala even now through pipelines, though.

The green grassland comprises sandy area and a population of 120,000 citizens. The inhabitant comprises Marwats, Khels, Hashmis, Janjua and Qureshis. The local language spoken is Pashto with a soft and sweet dialect. The prominent shrine of Haji Baba and two important graves of Sahabis are also situated.
The bluch tribe is well known tribe in Paniala. There is difference between bluch and niazi tribes. Both are Pathans but having different origin. But Pathans living in Punjab mostly can not speak pashto. They say their ancestors were pashtoons and now they have forgotten their ancestors languages. And speak local Punjab Language i.e sariki, Punjabi, Urdu etc.

Fruits of the town include mangoes and dates. "Dhakki" is a major part of export.

The nearby picnic spots are TOY (a natural water resort and play ground) and the mountainous hilly region of Sheikh Badin that comprises lush green forest, an old nonfunctioning post office and police station of British time.

Tribes 
The main tribe is the Blach, Pathans, and its subtribes are: Sain khel, Achackzai Durani, Siraj Khel, Malana, Utta Khail, Mehmood Khel, Mala Khel, Mansoor Khel, Hassan Khel, Madda  Khel, Masti Khel, Noor-e khel and kuchekhel (many of them had migrated to other cities (e.g., Kalorkot, Piplan) Qalander Khel, Shadi Khel, Dhedi, Mumrez Khel, Karaki Khel, Sangher khel, Syed, Mada Khel, Changa Khel, Quresh, Kundi, Baloch, Sharbi Khel, Merwan Khel, Sharqi Khel, Mehmand, Zargar, Sheikh, Slemi Khel and Ira Khel etc. Actually, all these tribes are the extensions of Blach Pathans which is partially different from Marwat tribe.
Dhadi, Masti Khel, Bani Hashim Quraish and Syeds are the most prominent sub tribes of the area. Khan Merban Khan, the Khan of Paniala, Battar Khan, khan Ghulam Sarwar Khan, ex commissioner and revenue minister of West Pakistan, Ghulam Akbar khan, Khan Abdul Rashid Khan (ex MPA), Haji Sher Akbar Khan, Khan Javad Akbar Khan ex MPA are the prominent members of Dhedi family. Sana Ullah Khan (MNA) migrated to Bhakkar, Asmat Ullah Khan, political activist, Fakhrudin Khan and Ghulo Khan are the figure of Masti Khel family. Raza Muhammad Shah was a prominent figure of Quraish (Bani Hashim) tribe and was honoured with chair in Court for the recognition of his services for the area.  He was the descendant of Makhdoom ul Makhadeem Ghous Baha ud Din Zikria.  Ahmad Nawaz Shah, the staunch supporter of Quaid e Azam and Pakistan Movement, who served as polling agent during historical referendum of NWFP, was the descendant of Bani hashim Quraish.  Pir Khaki Shah and Pir Noran Shah are the prominent spiritual leaders of Paniala and surrounding area. Ayub Sheikh was the well-known social personality of the locality. He had cordial relations with Mukhdoom's of Bilot. Mir Hamza Khan and Aman Ullah Khan (Khan ustad) Siraj Khel were the followers of nationalist movement. Khudai Khidmat Gaar khan Abdul Ghafar Khan visited their Hujra to spread his message in that very area. Gernail Abdul Aziz was the famous nationalist personality of the area, who spent some part of his life in Mach jail Baluchistan due to his nationalist approach. Subhani Saib and Topi saiban have their followers as they are spiritual leaders of the people. Haji Baba is the most distinguished and famous spiritual Ziyarat of the area. His annual urs is celebrated evey year on 23 March at his tomb.

Haris sainkhel bluch

Facilities
Paniala town is facilitated with a government hospital, a degree College for male and high schools for both male and female and higher secondary school for girls. There are Five private institutions, Al-Hira Model High School, Pakistan Campus School & College, Muslim Public High School, City Grammar School and Paniala Science School & College. Also there is a Montessori School named The Guardian Montessori School Paniala started in 2017. There are 3 primary schools for boys and 3 primary schools for girls. A post office, a bank HBL (Habib Bank Limited), an agriculture office and Lari Adda (لاری اڈہ) are also in Paniala.There is one football stadium & many popular football clubs in Paniala, which produced many talented players like Jaffar Khan (Former Captain Pakistan National Football Team.)

Places
The town has many scenic places in the surrounding peaks and the town is also famous for the Shrine of Haji Baba. Mazarate Saadat and Mansoor khel's are at the top of a little mountain. Kot Ghundi is also a place form where a glorious scene of Paniala can be viewed. Toy is a place where young, old and little kids play after noon daily. Ubo Sar is a place from where water are flowing  beside the town. Kach Jaroba Sagi Kot Ghundi, Hasini Wala, Tora Ghundi, Speenay Ghari, Jalar, Pahle, and pathi bagh are best places for photography. Paniala town is surrounded by layers of mango and date farms; these gardens are irrigated through natural streams called Karez. The inhabitants of Paniala have large land holdings in the area, which are arid.

References

External links
 https://web.archive.org/web/20090912063825/http://www.edanial.com/paniala.html
 https://web.archive.org/web/20070921203729/http://www.khyber.org/places/sheikhbadin.shtml

Union councils of Dera Ismail Khan District